Bocanda is a town in east-central Ivory Coast. It is a sub-prefecture of and seat of Bocanda Department in N'Zi Region, Lacs District. Bocanda is also a commune.

The town has a small regional medical center, a mayor's office, an active marketplace, a petrol station, a high school, five primary schools, a Catholic church, several Protestant churches, and a mosque. The traditional residents are of the Baoulé tribe; however, there is also a large Dyula population.

In 2014, the population of the sub-prefecture of Bocanda was 60,183.

Villages
The 56 villages of the sub-prefecture of Bocanda and their population in 2014 are:

References

Sub-prefectures of N'Zi Region
Communes of N'Zi Region